David John Ten Eyck (born December 29, 1953) is an American politician in the state of Minnesota. He served in the Minnesota State Senate.

References

Democratic Party Minnesota state senators
1953 births
Living people